Hinata is a common Japanese given name, and a Japanese family name.

Possible writings and meanings
The reading of Hinata can be written using many different combinations of kanji, such as:
日, "sun; day; date"
日向, "in the sun; facing the sun"
日陽, "day sun; sunny yang"
日暖, "sunny warmth and geniality; warmth of the sun"
日菜, "sunny vegetables"
日詩, "sunny poem; poetry of the sun"
日南, "sunny south; the sun's southern side; the south of the sun"
日寿, "sunny longevity"
日当, "daily allowance; per day; sunlit; exposed to the sun"
日當, "sunny undertaking; the sun serves; the sun withstands"
日方, "sunny side; sunny direction; in the direction of the sun"
日宛, "sunny address; just like the sun"
日和, "sunny harmony; sunny japan; japan's harmony"
日奈多, "many sunny what"
日奈太, "large sunny what"
日菜多, "many sunny greens"
日菜太, "large sunny vegetables"
日菜詩, "sunny vegetable poem"
日菜珠, "sunny vegetable pearl"
日向太, "thick under the sun"
日向汰, "elimination under the sun; eliminated under the sun"
日向大, "big under the sun"
日向陽, "yang under the sun; a sun under the sun; a sun facing towards the sun"
日那向, "under that sun; facing towards that sun"
日那多, "many sunny what"
日那太, "large sunny what"
日那田, "sunny what cropland"
日南田, "sunny southern cropland; a cropland on the south of the sun"
日南羽, "sunny southern feathers; feathers on the south of the sun"
日名田, "sunny famous cropland; a famous cropland of the sun"
日永田, "sunny eternal cropland"
陽向, "in the sun; facing the sun"
灯向, "facing towards the lamp; facing towards the lantern"
灯成多, "the lamp/lantern becomes many; the lamp/lantern succeeds in many"
向日葵, "sunflower"
向陽, "towards the sun"
太陽, "the sun"
春陽, "summer sun; summer yang"
暖, "warm and genial"
暖太, "large warmth"
光暖, "bright and warm; warmth of the light"
光永, "bright light forever"
彩羽, "colorful feathers"
羽叶, "the feather grants; the feather answers; the feather makes it come true"
雛多, "many young birds"
雛太, "large young bird"
雛田, "young bird cropland"
雛音, "sounds of a young bird"
南, "south; southern"
The name can also be written in hiragana (ひなた) and katakana (ヒナタ), although, it loses its meaning in these forms.

People

First name

Male
, Japanese professional boxer
, Japanese footballer
, Japanese footballer
, Japanese kickboxer

Female
Hinata, a ring name of Japanese professional wrestler Leon
, Japanese idol singer
, Japanese idol singer
, Japanese women's footballer
, Japanese actress and voice actress
, Japanese manga artist
, Japanese kickboxer

Surname
, Japanese musician
, Japanese voice actress

Fictional characters

First name

Male
, one of Takumi's retainers  in Fire Emblem Fates.
, a character from the manga series I Am Here!
, a character from the manga and anime series Kaichou wa Maid-sama!.
, a marriageable candidate in the Japanese farming simulation game Story of Seasons: Trio of Towns.

Female
, the female ranger in Pokémon Ranger.
, a character in the Japanese hentai game Pure Pure.
, the main character of the manga Suki: A Like Story.
, a character from the manga and anime series Kanamemo.
, a character in the Japanese anime Ro-Kyu-Bu!.
, a character from the manga and anime series Mirai Nikki.
 a character in the anime Healin' Good Pretty Cure.
, a character from the manga and anime series Naruto.
, a character from the manga and anime series March Comes in Like a Lion.
, a character from the manga series Today's Cerberus.
, a character from the manga series Encouragement of Climb.
, a character from the anime series A Place Further Than the Universe.
, a character from the visual novel Wind: A Breath of Heart.
, a character from the Assassination Classroom manga and anime series.
, a character from the light novel, manga and anime series That Time I Got Reincarnated as a Slime.
, a character from the manga Koimoku.
, the baby sister of Hiro Sohma from the manga Fruits Basket.
, a character and Takemichi’s girlfriend from the manga and anime series Tokyo Revengers.
, a character and Wakaba’s best friend in Nogi Wakaba is a Hero.
, a character from the Rival Schools fighting game series.

Surname
The  from the manga and anime series Sgt. Frog.
, a character from the Ninpuu Sentai Hurricaneger.

Male
, the protagonist of the video game Danganronpa 2: Goodbye Despair.
, a character from the anime Angel Beats!.
, the main character of Haikyū!! with the position of middle blocker from Karasuno High.

Female
, the main character of the novel Brothers Conflict.
, the main character of the anime series Himawari!.
, a fictional all-girls' dormitory in the Kanagawa Prefecture from the anime and manga Love Hina.
, a character of the manga and anime Blend-S
Koharu Hinata, a character in the video game Yandere Simulator
, the younger sister of Shōyō Hinata in Haikyū!!.

Japanese unisex given names
Japanese-language surnames